Per "Gerhard" Hoberstorfer (born 18 November 1963) is a Swedish actor, singer and dancer.

Hoberstorfer grew up in Boliden and Järfälla and studied at the Dans- och cirkushögskolan in Stockholm, and Teaterhögskolan in Malmö. He sings in the band Bad Liver. He got his breakthrough in 1989 as an actor in the TV-series Flickan vid stenbänken. Hoberstorfer has worked at the Stockholms stadsteater since 1999. There, he has acted in plays like Ett drömspel, Hair, Tre systrar, Hamlet, Idioten, Fröken Julie, En midsommarnattsdröm, and HeddA Gabler.

Hoberstorfer is the brother of TV-producer Kristian Hoberstorfer. He is in a relationship with Marietta von Hausswolff von Baumgarten, with whom he has two sons. He also has a daughter from another relationship.

References

External links 

Living people
1963 births
Swedish male actors